Bill Healey is a former professional rugby league footballer who played in the 1950s.

Playing career

Challenge Cup Final appearances
Bill Healey played  in Barrow's 21–12 victory over Workington Town in the 1955 Challenge Cup Final during the 1954–55 season at Wembley Stadium, London on Saturday 30 April 1955, in front of a crowd of 66,513.

County Cup Final appearances
Bill Healey played  in Barrow's 12–2 victory over Oldham in the 1954 Lancashire County Cup Final during the 1954–55 season at Station Road, Swinton on Saturday 23 October 1954., and played  in the 7–9 defeat by Leeds in the 1957 Challenge Cup Final during the 1956–57 season at Wembley Stadium, London on Saturday 11 May 1957, in front of a crowd of 76,318.

References

External links

Search for "Healey" at rugbyleagueproject.org

Barrow Raiders players
English rugby league players
Place of birth missing
Rugby league second-rows
Year of birth missing